The 1975 Green Bay Packers season was their 57th season overall and their 55th season in the National Football League. Under new head coach Bart Starr, they finished at 4–10, last in the four-team NFC Central division.

The Packers opened with four losses, then beat the Super Bowl-bound Dallas Cowboys on the road for Starr's first coaching win. After a 1–8 start, Green Bay ended the season on a positive note, winning three of their final five games.

Offseason

NFL draft

Roster

Regular season

Schedule 
In Week 5, the Packers defeated the Dallas Cowboys on the road, improving their all-time record to 8–1 over the Cowboys; the sole loss was in 1970. Dallas was the eventual NFC champion and advanced to Super Bowl X. 

Monday (September 29)
Note: Intra-division opponents are in bold text.

Game summaries

Week 10 

 Source: Pro-Football-Reference.com

Week 11

Standings

Awards and records

References 

 Sportsencyclopedia.com

Green Bay Packers seasons
Green Bay Packers
Green